Inuncus is a monotypic moth genus in the family Epermeniidae described by Reinhard Gaedike in 2013. Its sole species, Inuncus juratae, was described by the same author in the same year. It is found in Kenya and Tanzania.

References

Moths described in 2013
Epermeniidae
Monotypic moth genera
Lepidoptera of Kenya
Lepidoptera of Tanzania
Moths of Africa